Okan Deniz (born 20 May 1994) is a Turkish footballer who plays as a winger for Amed.

Deniz began his career with Bursaspor in 2007 and made his professional debut during the 2011-12 season. Deniz is also a youth international with caps at the under-16, 17 and 18 levels.

International career
Deniz represented Turkey at the 2013 UEFA European Under-19 Championship.

Personal life
Deniz is one of ten children. His footballing idol is Didier Drogba.

References

External links
 
 
 Okan Deniz at Osmanlıspor

1994 births
People from Korkut
Kurdish sportspeople
Living people
Turkish footballers
Turkey youth international footballers
Turkey under-21 international footballers
Association football forwards
Bursaspor footballers
Balıkesirspor footballers
İnegölspor footballers
Pendikspor footballers
Ankaraspor footballers
Sarıyer S.K. footballers
Süper Lig players
TFF First League players
TFF Second League players